Gjerde is a surname. Notable people with the surname include:

Barry Gjerde (born 1951), Norwegian-born Canadian-Japanese voice actor
Bjartmar Gjerde (1931–2009), Norwegian politician
Gunn Berit Gjerde (born 1954), Norwegian politician
John Gjerde (born 1929), Norwegian politician 
Jon Gjerde (1953–2008), American historian
Øyvind Gjerde (born 1977), Norwegian footballer